Mundal may refer to:

Places
Mundal, an alternative name of Fjærland, a village in Sogndal Municipality, at the end of the Fjærlandsfjorden, in Vestland county, Norway
Mundal Lagoon, a lagoon in Puttalam District, western Sri Lanka

People
Else Mundal (born 1944), Norwegian philologist
Mundal Singh, Indian freedom fighter